Evelyn Miot (born 1943), Miss Haiti Universe, was the first black woman to reach the top fifteen finalists position in the Miss Universe pageant. Miot was a semi-finalist in the Miss Universe 1962 pageant, won by Argentine Norma Nolan.

References

1940s births
Haitian beauty pageant winners
Haitian female models
Living people
Miss Universe 1962 contestants